Anna Sobczak (born 2 November 1967) is a Polish fencer. She competed in the women's individual and team foil events at the 1988 and 1992 Summer Olympics.

References

External links
 

1967 births
Living people
Polish female fencers
Olympic fencers of Poland
Fencers at the 1988 Summer Olympics
Fencers at the 1992 Summer Olympics
Sportspeople from Gdynia
21st-century Polish women
20th-century Polish women